Benjamin Myers (born 1978) is an Australian theologian and religious writer.

Ben Myers or Benjamin Myers may also refer to:

 Ben Myers (born 1976), English writer and journalist
 Benjamin Myers (born 1975), American poet, essayist, educator and musician

See also
 Myers